Waldo Township is one of the fifteen townships of Marion County, Ohio, United States.  The 2010 census found 1,143 people in the township, 338 of whom lived in the village of Waldo.

Geography
Located in the southeastern corner of the county, it borders the following townships:
Richland Township - northeast
Westfield Township, Morrow County - east
Marlboro Township, Delaware County - south
Radnor Township, Delaware County - southwest corner
Prospect Township - west
Pleasant Township - northwest

The village of Waldo is located in western Waldo Township.

Name and history
It is the only Waldo Township statewide.

Government
The township is governed by a three-member board of trustees, who are elected in November of odd-numbered years to a four-year term beginning on the following January 1. Two are elected in the year after the presidential election and one is elected in the year before it. There is also an elected township fiscal officer, who serves a four-year term beginning on April 1 of the year after the election, which is held in November of the year before the presidential election. Vacancies in the fiscal officership or on the board of trustees are filled by the remaining trustees.

References

External links
County website

Townships in Marion County, Ohio
Townships in Ohio